Acrocercops rhombocosma is a moth of the family Gracillariidae. It is known from the Seychelles.

References

rhombocosma
Moths of Africa
Moths described in 1911
Fauna of Seychelles